Marie Courtois (c. 1655 – 13 October 1703) was a French miniature painter. She was a pupil of Le Brun. In 1675 she married Marc Nattier (1642–1705), a portrait painter. They were the parents of the more famous portrait painter Jean-Marc Nattier (1685 – 1766), their second son. She died in Paris in 1703.

References
 

Year of birth unknown
1703 deaths
Portrait miniaturists
17th-century French painters
18th-century French painters
Year of birth uncertain
French women painters
18th-century French women artists
17th-century French women artists